Ellershouse is a rural community in the Canadian province of Nova Scotia, located in the Municipal District of West Hants.  It is the birthplace of Medal of Bravery (Canada) recipient Petty Officer 2nd Class John George Yurcak, M.B., C.D., Wall of Valour.

References 

Ellershouse on Destination Nova Scotia

Communities in Hants County, Nova Scotia
General Service Areas in Nova Scotia